Kavak may refer to:

Places
 Kavak, Arhavi, a village in the District of Arhavi, Artvin Province, Turkey
 Kavak, İskilip, a village in the İskilip District of Çorum Province in Turkey
 Kavak, Maden, a village in the Maden District of Elazığ Province in Turkey
 Kavak, Samsun, a district in Samsun Province, Turkey
 Kavak, Silifke, a village in Silifke district of Mersin Province, Turkey
 Kavak, Yapraklı, a village in the Yapraklı district of Çankırı Province in Turkey
 Kara-Kavak, a village in the Osh Province of Kyrgyzstan

Other uses
 Kavak (company), a unicorn startup company
 Kavak Yelleri, a Turkish television series
 Erhan Kavak (born 1987), Turkish-Swiss footballer

See also
 Kavač, Kotor, Montenegro
 Kavac Indian village, within the Canaima National Park in Bolívar State, Venezuela
 Kavaklıdere (disambiguation)

Turkish-language surnames